Dyschirius fabbrii is a species of ground beetle in the subfamily Scaritinae. It was described by Bulirsch & Magrini in 2006.

References

fabbrii
Beetles described in 2006